Bazargulovo (Baźarğol) is a rural locality (a village) in Uralsky Selsoviet, Uchalinsky District, Bashkortostan, Russia. The population was 47 as of 2010. There are 2 streets.

Geography 
Bazargulovo is located 32 km southwest of Uchaly (the district's administrative centre) by road. Rasulevo is the nearest rural locality.

References 

Rural localities in Uchalinsky District